Deer Creek is a small stream, a right tributary of Matadero Creek, originating in the foothills of the Santa Cruz Mountains in Santa Clara County, California, United States. From its source in Los Altos Hills, the creek flows in a northerly direction for to join Matadero Creek in Palo Alto.

Deer Creek begins at elevation 680 feet just north of Altamount Road and west of Taafe Road in Los Altos Hills, then flows northerly passing under Interstate 280 at the La Barranca Road underpass, where it turns west and parallels Purissima Road, crosses Arastradero Road and Deer Creek Road, before joining the Matadero Creek mainstem just south of Foothill Expressway and east of Page Mill Road.  Deer Creek has also been labelled as Purisima Creek on some maps.

References

Rivers of Santa Clara County, California
Tributaries of Matadero Creek